Eric Bruskotter is an American actor. He is best known for his role as Cleveland Indians rookie Catcher Rube Baker in Major League II and Major League: Back to the Minors as well as his role as Private Scott Baker in the TV series Tour Of Duty.  Bruskotter has an identical twin brother named Karl.

Career 
Bruskotter started acting in the mid-1980s, appearing in television shows like Mr. Belvedere and Amazing Stories. He gained notoriety when he appeared in the film Can't Buy Me Love in 1987. Later that year he appeared as Private Scott Baker in the TV series Tour of Duty, which followed the trials and tribulations of an army platoon, set against the backdrop of the Vietnam war. His identical twin brother, Karl Bruskotter (who sported a slightly different hairstyle so viewers could tell the two apart), had a guest appearance on the series as Scott Baker's twin brother with a knack for causing mischief, Private Karl Baker. Bruskotter left the series after its first season, but reprised his role in a guest appearance during the show's third and final season.

He returned to feature films with roles on such films as Crimson Tide and In the Line of Fire. He is perhaps more known for his role as Rube Baker in Major League II and Major League: Back to the Minors.

He appeared in two episodes of Walker Texas Ranger, starring Chuck Norris. In 1997, he had a role in the science fiction film Starship Troopers. During the film shoot he met Tami-Adrian George, who would become his real-life wife.

In the season 2 episodes of Sports Night, "Kyle Whitaker's  Got Two Sacks" and "The Reunion". In the former he played Kyle Whitaker, an NFL player on an unnamed Cleveland based team who gets suspended because as a player caught in an illegal steroid abuse ring. In "The Reunion", his character is important to the back story of lead character Dana Whitaker. In 2007, he appeared in two episodes of 24 during Season 6. In 2011, he appeared as a suitor of Shannon Beiste (Dot-Marie Jones) on Glee,  football recruiter/talent scout Cooter Menkins.

Personal life

Eric is currently married to Tami-Adrian George. He is also a volunteer with the Best Friends Animal Society, an animal rescue group based in Kanab, Utah.

Filmography

References

External links 
 
 

Male actors from Indiana
American male film actors
Living people
Actors from Fort Wayne, Indiana
American twins
Year of birth missing (living people)